"Carry You Home" is a song by Dutch disc jockey and producer Tiësto. It features production from Norwegian music producing team StarGate and vocals from American singer and songwriter Aloe Blacc. It was released on 29 September 2017 by Musical Freedom in the Netherlands as the fourth single from Tiësto's compilation, Club Life, Vol. 5 - China.

Critical reception 
According to Kat Bein from Billboard, "'Carry You Home' is the friend you deserve in your time of need. Beautiful vocals from Aloe Blacc are a strong wind under the wings of this electronic hook. [...] StarGate come through with a production assist to help make this tune as grand and wide-open as long country roads." We Rave You considers that "the melody is where the true character lies in this feel-good anthem that certainly brings an uplifting atmosphere to its sound. From start to finish 'Carry You Home' is never short of a stimulating beat as the track builds to an exhilarating and rapturous chorus."

Music video 
The music video of the song was released on 16 October 2017. It was directed and produced by That One Blond Kid Corp.

Track listing 
Digital Download (MF219)
 "Carry You Home" - 3:12

Transluscent Green 7" (MF219)
 "Carry You Home" - 3:44
 "Carry You Home" (Tiësto's Big Room Remix) - 4:24

Digital Download - Remixes
 "Carry You Home" (Tiësto's AFTR:HRS Remix) - 3:28
 "Carry You Home" (CRVVCKS Remix) - 4:55
 "Carry You Home" (Swanky Tunes Remix) - 3:02
 "Carry You Home" (Lulleaux Remix) - 3:16

Charts

References 

2017 songs
2017 singles
Tiësto songs
Aloe Blacc songs
Songs written by Mikkel Storleer Eriksen
Songs written by Tor Erik Hermansen
Songs written by Aloe Blacc
Songs written by Tiësto
Stargate (record producers) songs
Song recordings produced by Stargate (record producers)